The 1928 Delaware Fightin' Blue Hens football team was an American football team that represented the University of Delaware in the 1928 college football season. In their second season under head coach Joseph J. Rothrock, the Blue Hens compiled a 2–6 record and were outscored by a total of 144 to 44. The team played its home games at Frazer Field in Newark, Delaware.

Schedule

References

Delaware
Delaware Fightin' Blue Hens football seasons
Delaware Fightin' Blue Hens football